Siege of Nisibis may refer to:
Siege of Nisibis (194)
Siege of Nisibis (235)
Siege of Nisibis (252) by the Sassanids under Shapur I
Siege of Nisibis (338) by the Sassanids under Shapur II
Siege of Nisibis (346) by the Sassanids under Shapur II
Siege of Nisibis (350) by the Sassanids under Shapur II
Siege of Nisibis (573)

See also
Battle of Nisibis (disambiguation)